Alberto Cisolla (born 10 October 1977 in Treviso) is an Italian volleyball player.

Cisolla, standing at 1.97 m for 87 kg, plays passing-hitter for Callipo Sport.

He won six Italian titles, three European Champions cup, and, with Italian national team, one European Championship (2005, also declared MVP of the tournament).  He won a silver medal as part of the Italian team at the 2004 Summer Olympics and also played in the team that came fourth at the 2008 Summer Olympics.

Clubs

Individual awards
 2005 European Championship "Most Valuable Player"

State awards
 2004  Officer's Order of Merit of the Italian Republic

References

External links 
 
 
 
 
 

1977 births
Living people
Sportspeople from Treviso
Italian men's volleyball players
Olympic volleyball players of Italy
Olympic silver medalists for Italy
Volleyball players at the 2004 Summer Olympics
Volleyball players at the 2008 Summer Olympics
Olympic medalists in volleyball
Medalists at the 2004 Summer Olympics